The Bella Cup is a tournament for professional female tennis players played on outdoor clay courts. The event is classified as a $60,000+H ITF Women's Circuit tournament. It is held annually in Toruń, Poland since 1995. The tournament was previously a $50,000+H tournament in 2011. In 2019, the tournament was upgraded to $60,000+H level after being at $25,000 since 2012.

Past finals

Singles

Doubles

External links 
 
 ITF search

ITF Women's World Tennis Tour
Clay court tennis tournaments
Tennis tournaments in Poland
Recurring sporting events established in 1995